Jaroslav Mostecký (29 September 1963 in Zábřeh – 13 December 2020) was a Czech science fiction writer.

Biography
He won the science fiction fandom related Karel Čapek prize in 1997.

Mostecký died from COVID-19 during the COVID-19 pandemic in the Czech Republic.

References

External links
 Legie.info - author Jaroslav Mostecký - (Czech)
 Entry at isfdb.org

Czech science fiction writers
1963 births
2020 deaths
People from Zábřeh
Deaths from the COVID-19 pandemic in the Czech Republic